Striped Entertainment is an American film distributor and international sales company.  The company was formed in 2012 and specializes in foreign and independent films.

One of the first films distributed by Striped Entertainment was the Scottish chiller Graders, which was wrongly reported to be in part based on a real life criminal case but in fact was totally fictional.

The first theatrical release was the feature film Brief Reunion, directed by John Daschbach.

Films

References

External links
 Striped Entertainment - official site

Film distributors of the United States
2012 establishments in New York (state)
Entertainment companies based in New York City